Bernhard Perren (1 May 1928 – 31 August 1960) was a Swiss alpine skier and mountain guide. He was born in Zermatt.

Selected results 
 1950:
 1st, Giant slalom skiing, Lauberhorn
 4th, FIS Alpine World Ski Championships – Men's downhill
 1951:
 1st, Swiss alpine skiing championships – Men's giant slalom
 1st, Swiss alpine skiing championships – Men's downhill
 1952:
 1st, Swiss alpine skiing championships – Men's downhill (1952)
 8th, Winter Olympics – Men's giant slalom
 21st, Winter Olympics – Men's slalom
 26th, Winter Olympics – Men's downhill
 1953:
 1st, Hahnenkamm, Kitzbühel – downhill (1953)

References

1928 births
1960 deaths
Swiss male alpine skiers
Olympic alpine skiers of Switzerland
Alpine skiers at the 1952 Winter Olympics
Alpine guides
People from Zermatt
Sportspeople from Valais
20th-century Swiss people